Todarpur, also spelled Tondarpur, is a village and corresponding community development block in Shahabad tehsil of Hardoi district, Uttar Pradesh, India. The village has several schools and one clinic. It hosts neither a haat nor a mandi (regular market). The staple crops here are wheat and rice. As of 2011, its population is 3,846, in 603 households.

The village is the site of an old Thathera khera, and was historically the seat of the Onai branch of the Chamar Gaurs.

Demographic history 
The 1961 Census recorded Todarpur as comprising 3 hamlets and having a population of 1,532 (853 male and 679 female), in 282 households and 208 physical houses.

The 1981 Census recorded Todarpur as having an area of 433.43 hectares and having a population of 2,088 people, in 449 households.

Villages 
Todarpur CD block has the following 115 villages:

References 

Villages in Hardoi district